The 2008 Interprovincial Hurling Championship was the 81st staging of the Interprovincial Championship since its establishment by the Gaelic Athletic Association in 1927. The championship began on 25 October 2008 and ended on 1 November 2008.

Munster were the defending champions.

On 1 November 2008, Leinster won the championship following a 1-15 to 1-12 defeat of Munster in the final at O'Moore Park. This was their 26th championship title overall and their first title since 2006.

Munster's Eoin Kelly was the championship's top scorer with 1-12.

Results

Semi-finals

Final

Top scorers

Top scorers overall

References

Railway Cup Hurling Championship
Railway Cup Hurling Championship